Pigasus, a portmanteau of pig and Pegasus, may refer to:
 Pigasus (literature), John Steinbeck's personal stamp and a character in the Oz books
 Pigasus (politics), the Youth International Party ("Yippie") candidate for the U.S. presidency in 1968
 Pigasus Award, an award given out by James Randi which recognizes paranormal frauds